Metsla may refer to:
 Metsla, Järva County, Estonia
 Metsla, Viljandi County, Estonia